Sherwood Shores is an unincorporated community in Burnet County, Texas, United States. According to the Handbook of Texas, the community had an estimated population of 870 in 2000.

History
The area in what is known as Sherwood Shores today was first settled around the early 1960s when a Baptist church was chartered. It had two locations on the 1970s county highway map. At the same time, there was an Assembly of God church and a Seventh-day Adventist church. Its population was 870 in 2000 for both communities.

Geography

Education
Sherwood Shores is served by the Marble Falls Independent School District. Elementary-age kids attend Highland Lakes Elementary in Granite Shoals.

References

Unincorporated communities in Burnet County, Texas
Unincorporated communities in Texas